Joanna Mary Durie (born 27 July 1960) is a former world No. 5 tennis player from the United Kingdom. During her career, she also reached No. 9 in doubles, and won two Grand Slam titles, both in the mixed doubles with Jeremy Bates.

Born in Bristol, England, Jo Durie was the last British woman to reach the semifinal of a Grand Slam tournament until Johanna Konta reached the semifinal of the 2016 Australian Open, and the last British woman to win a major title in any discipline, until Heather Watson won the 2016 Wimbledon mixed doubles title with Henri Kontinen.

Singles career
After a successful junior career which included winning junior British titles on all three surfaces (grass, hard court and indoor) in 1976; Jo Durie turned professional in 1977, and played her first match at Wimbledon that year against the eventual champion Virginia Wade. In 1980 Durie suffered a major back injury which kept her out of the game for eight months. However, she made a successful return to the woman's tennis circuit in 1981, reaching the fourth round of the singles at Wimbledon and the US Open and climbing to her highest singles ranking so far of 31.

Her most successful year as a singles player was 1983, ending the season at No. 6 in the world rankings and on the prize money leader board. As an unseeded player Durie reached the semifinals of the French Open, beating both Pam Shriver and Tracy Austin along the way. Later that year she made another Grand Slam singles semifinal appearance at the US Open, where she eventually lost to Chris Evert in straight sets. Her dramatic rise up the singles rankings that year ended with a quarterfinal at the Australian Open in December. Durie's success as a singles player during 1983 gained her a coveted place at the 1984 WTA Tour Championship as the fifth seed.

Her most successful year at Wimbledon as a singles player came in 1984 when she reached the quarterfinals, beating a 15-year-old Steffi Graf in a memorable fourth-round match. It was just after Wimbledon that she reached a career-high singles ranking of world No. 5.

She won two top-level WTA singles titles (both in 1983) at Mahwah, New Jersey and Sydney, and had career wins over Steffi Graf, Zina Garrison, Pam Shriver, Hana Mandlíková, and Tracy Austin. Further back injuries in 1989 led to a remodeling of her service action. Durie made her last appearance in a WTA tour singles final at the Virginia Slims of Newport tournament in 1990. In 1991 at the age of 30, and one of the oldest singles competitors that year, she had another successful run to the fourth round of the US Open.

She was ranked the No. 1 British player for most of her career. She won the British National Singles title a record seven times. She was the second British woman player after Virginia Wade to win $1 million in prize money.

Doubles career
Partnering her fellow British player Jeremy Bates, Durie won the mixed doubles title at Wimbledon in 1987, the first British doubles team to win the title for fifty-one years. In 1991 they became the first British doubles team ever to win the Australian Open mixed doubles title. As of 2013 both of these records still stand. As a team Bates and Durie reached an additional three mixed doubles quarterfinals at Wimbledon in 1986, 1990 and 1993. They also reached the quarter-finals of the Australian Open in 1992 as defending champions.

Durie would go on to win five woman's doubles titles from eighteen finals during her career. Her most successful year as a doubles player, aside from the Grand Slams in 1987 and 1991 was in 1983, when she reached six finals, winning three titles. Durie also reached the semifinals of the women's doubles at the French Open and Wimbledon. By virtue of this success she gained a place at the 1984 WTA Tour Championship in doubles, and reached the final partnering Ann Kiyomura.

Durie won the British National Doubles title a record nine times.

Team tennis
Durie was a stalwart member of the British Wightman Cup (1979, 1981–89), British Federation Cup (1981–95) and British European Cup teams (1989–92). Durie was the youngest member of the British Federation Cup team, alongside Virginia Wade and Sue Barker, which reached the team final in 1981. Durie led the British team to victory in the European Championship in Prague in 1992.

Retirement
Durie retired from competitive tennis at the Wimbledon Championships in 1995, (her 18th appearance at the Championships), and marked it with a memorable performance. After three successive operations on her left knee, Durie went into the Championships ranked No. 326 in the world, yet reached the second round of the ladies' singles. She beat France's Alexia Dechaume-Balleret, ranked No. 85 in the world, in straight sets in the first round. Her second round, and last singles match at Wimbledon, was against Jana Novotná. Her last match at Wimbledon was a mixed doubles match on Centre Court, where she played alongside her long-standing partner Jeremy Bates.

She is one of the very few players to have a winning record against Steffi Graf and leads 4–3 in head-to-heads. Note, however, that all of her wins against Graf were before or during 1985, when Graf was typically a much lower-ranked player during the initial stages of her career.

After retiring from the professional tour, Durie had heart surgery to rectify a problem for which she had originally been prescribed Beta blockers early in her career. She did not take the prescribed medication, as she didn't feel well after taking them. She revealed this fact in March 2016 in an interview with BBC Radio 5 Live, after the revelation that Maria Sharapova had been found taking a similar heart-issue drug, which later had been banned by the World Anti-Doping Agency.

Since retirement, Durie has worked as a TV tennis commentator for both the BBC and British Eurosport. She used to coach British number one Elena Baltacha alongside her own former coach Alan Jones. She won back-to-back Wimbledon Ladies' Senior Invitation doubles titles in 1996 and 1997.

Durie currently works as an academy coach at the FC** Academy in Middlesex.

Significant finals

Grand Slam tournaments

Mixed doubles: 2 (2 titles)

Year-end championships

Doubles: 1 (runner–up)

WTA career finals

Singles: 6 (2–4)

Doubles: 18 (5–13)

Grand Slam performance timelines

Singles

Doubles

Mixed doubles

Note: The Australian Open was held twice in 1977, in January and December.

Federation Cup

 1 – In 1992 the 16 teams which lost in the first round of the main draw were re-drawn to face each other to maintain their positions in the World Group in 1993. The four teams which won their two knock-out play-off ties successfully defended their places in the World Group whilst the 12 teams which did not were relegated.
 2 – In 1993 the 16 teams which lost in the first round of the main draw were re-drawn to face each other to maintain their positions in the World Group in 1994. The eight teams which won their knock-out play-off ties successfully defended their places in the World Group whilst the eight losing teams were relegated.

References

External links
 
 
 

1960 births
Living people
Australian Open (tennis) champions
English female tennis players
British female tennis players
English tennis coaches
Hopman Cup competitors
People educated at Clifton High School, Bristol
Tennis people from Bristol
English tennis commentators
Wimbledon champions
Grand Slam (tennis) champions in mixed doubles
Female sports coaches